Victor Pineda (born March 15, 1993) is an American former professional soccer player who played as a midfielder.

Career

Professional
The first homegrown player in Chicago Fire history, Pineda signed with the first team in August 2010. That year the midfielder lead the Chicago Fire U-16 Academy with eight goals and helped his team win the U.S. Soccer Federation Development Academy National Championship (in which he scored the first penalty kick of the penalty kick shootout).  He was subsequently called up to the United States U-18 national team and scored twice during the international tournaments.  On February 17, 2012, Pineda was selected to the national U-20 team as one of the two team leaders.

Pineda made his MLS debut on March 23, 2014, in a match against New York Red Bulls.

On June 13, 2014, Pineda moved to NASL team Indy Eleven on loan. He signed with Indy for the 2015 season after he was released by Chicago.

In December 2015, Pineda signed with Fort Lauderdale Strikers.

Personal
His brother, Mauricio, signed with the Fire in early 2020 after playing several years of college soccer.

References

External links
 

1993 births
Living people
American soccer players
Chicago Fire FC players
Indy Eleven players
Fort Lauderdale Strikers players
Association football midfielders
Soccer players from Illinois
Sportspeople from DuPage County, Illinois
Major League Soccer players
North American Soccer League players
United States men's youth international soccer players
United States men's under-20 international soccer players
United States men's under-23 international soccer players
People from Bolingbrook, Illinois
Homegrown Players (MLS)